E3 ubiquitin-protein ligase CCNB1IP1 is an enzyme that in humans is encoded by the CCNB1IP1 gene.

HEI10 is a member of the E3 ubiquitin ligase family and functions in progression of the cell cycle through G(2)/M.[supplied by OMIM] It is considered a housekeeping gene.

References

External links

Further reading